William Whittaker may refer to:

 Red Whittaker (William L. Whittaker), roboticist and research professor of robotics at Carnegie Mellon University
 Bill Whittaker (bowls), former lawn bowls competitor for New Zealand
 Bill Whittaker (footballer) (1922–1977), footballer for Charlton Athletic, Huddersfield Town, Crystal Palace and Cambridge United
 Bill Whittaker (journalist) (1930–2009), Australian horse racing journalist
 William G. Whittaker (1876–1944), English composer

See also 
 William Whitaker (disambiguation)